A ghetto is a part of a city in which members of a minority group  live, especially as a result of political, social, legal, environmental or economic pressure. Ghettos are often known for being more impoverished than other areas of the city. Versions of the ghetto appear across the world, each with their own names, classifications, and groupings of people.

The term was originally used for the Venetian Ghetto in Venice, Italy, as early as 1516, to describe the part of the city where Jewish people were restricted to live and thus segregated from other people. However, early societies may have formed their own versions of the same structure; words resembling ghetto in meaning appear in Hebrew, Yiddish, Italian, Germanic, Old French, and Latin. During the Holocaust, more than 1,000 Nazi ghettos were established to hold the Jewish populations of Europe, with the goal of exploiting and killing European Jews as part of the Final Solution of Nazi Germany.

The term ghetto acquired deep cultural meaning in the United States, especially in the context of segregation and civil rights; as such, it has been widely used in the country to refer to poor neighborhoods. It is also used in some European countries such as Romania and Slovenia to refer to poor neighborhoods.

Etymology 
The word ghetto comes from the Jewish area of Venice, the Venetian Ghetto in Cannaregio, traced to a special use of Venetian ghèto, meaning 'foundry', as there was one near the site of that city's ghetto in 1516. By 1899, the term had been extended to crowded urban quarters of other minority groups.

The etymology of the word is uncertain, as there is no agreement among etymologists about the origins of the Venetian language term. According to various theories it comes from:
the above-mentioned Venetian ghèto ('foundry')
the Hebrew get (bill of divorce, deed of separation)
the Yiddish gehektes ('enclosed')
the Late Latin Giudaicetum (Jewish enclave)
the Italian borghetto ('little town, small section of a town'; diminutive of borgo, a word of Germanic origin; see borough)
the Old French  ('guard')
Another possibility is from the Italian Egitto ('Egypt', from Latin: Aegyptus), possibly in memory of the exile of the Israelites in Egypt.

Jewish ghettos

Europe 

The character of ghettos has varied through times. The term was used for an area in Jewish quarter, which meant the area of a city traditionally inhabited by Jews in the diaspora. Jewish quarters, like the Jewish ghettos in Europe, were often the outgrowths of segregated ghettos instituted by the surrounding authorities. A Yiddish term for a Jewish quarter or neighborhood is Di yiddishe gas, or 'The Jewish street'. Many European and Middle Eastern cities once had a historical Jewish quarter.

Jewish ghettos in Europe existed because Jews were viewed as outsiders. As a result, Jews were placed under strict regulations throughout many European cities.

In some cases, the ghetto was a Jewish quarter with a relatively affluent population (for instance the Jewish ghetto in Venice). In other cases, ghettos were places of terrible poverty and during periods of population growth, ghettos (as that of Rome) had narrow streets and tall, crowded houses. Residents had their own justice system.

Nazi-occupied Europe 

During World War II, ghettos were established by the Nazis to confine Jews and Romani into tightly packed areas of the cities of Eastern Europe. The Nazis most often referred to these areas in documents and signage at their entrances as "Jewish quarter." These Nazi ghettos sometimes coincided with traditional Jewish ghettos and Jewish quarters, but not always. On June 21, 1943, Heinrich Himmler issued a decree ordering the dissolution of all ghettos in the East and their transformation into Nazi concentration camps.

Morocco 
A mellah (Arabic: ملاح; probably from Arabic ملح, 'salt') is a walled Jewish quarter of a city in Morocco, an analogue of the European ghetto. Jewish populations were confined to mellahs in Morocco beginning from the 15th century and especially since the early 19th century. In cities, a mellah was surrounded by a wall with a fortified gateway. Usually, the Jewish quarter was situated near the royal palace or the residence of the governor in order to protect its inhabitants from recurring riots. In contrast, rural mellahs were separate villages inhabited solely by the Jews.

Shanghai ghetto 
The Shanghai Ghetto was an area of approximately one square mile (≈2.6km2) in the Hongkou District of Japanese-occupied Shanghai to which about 20,000 Jewish refugees were relocated by the Japanese-issued Proclamation Concerning Restriction of Residence and Business of Stateless Refugees, after having fled from German-occupied Europe before and during World War II.

United States

Early ghettos 

The development of ghettos in the United States is closely associated with different waves of immigration and internal urban migration. The Irish and German immigrants of the mid-19th century were the first ethnic groups to form ethnic enclaves in United States cities. This was followed by large numbers of immigrants from Southern and Eastern Europe, including many Italians and Poles between 1880 and 1920. Most of these remained in their established immigrant communities, but by the second or third generation, many families were able to relocate to better housing in the suburbs after World War II.

These ethnic ghetto areas included the Lower East Side in Manhattan, New York, which later became notable as predominantly Jewish, and East Harlem, which was once predominantly Italian and became home to a large Puerto Rican community in the 1950s. Little Italys across the country were predominantly Italian ghettos. Many Polish immigrants moved to sections like Pilsen of Chicago and Polish Hill of Pittsburgh. Brighton Beach in Brooklyn is the home of mostly Russian and Ukrainian (mostly Jewish) immigrants.

During the Great Depression, many people would congregate in large open parking lots. They built shelters out of whatever materials they could find at the time. These congregations of shelters were also called "ghettos."

Black or African-American ghettos 

A commonly used definition of a ghetto is a community distinguished by a homogeneous race or ethnicity. Additionally, a key feature that developed throughout the post-industrial era and continues to symbolize the demographics of American ghettos is the prevalence of poverty. Poverty constitutes the separation of ghettos from other, suburbanized or private neighborhoods. The high percentage of poverty partly justifies the difficulty of emigration, which tends to reproduce constraining social opportunities and inequalities in society.

The term ghettos has been commonly used for some time, but ghettos were around long before the term was coined. Urban areas in the U.S. can often be classified as "black" or "white", with the inhabitants primarily belonging to a homogenous racial grouping. This classification can be traced back as early as the year 1880 as African Americans were living in their own neighborhoods. Sixty years after the American civil rights movement of the 1950s and 1960s, most of the United States remains a residentially segregated society in which black people and white people inhabit different neighborhoods of significantly different quality.

Many of these neighborhoods are located in Northern and Western cities where African-Americans moved during the Great Migration (1914–1970), a period when over a million African-Americans moved out of the rural southern United States to escape the widespread racism of the South; to seek out employment opportunities in urban environments; and to pursue what was widely perceived to be a better quality of life in the North and West, such as New York City, Detroit, Cleveland, Chicago, Pittsburgh, Los Angeles, Oakland, Portland, and Seattle. This perception did not end up being reality as many had hoped and dreamed. 1919 started race wars in Northern states and specifically in Chicago. These racist attacks directed at blacks were extremely violent, they included the likes of bombing African Americans’ homes and killing of many other innocent blacks. These attacks were given the name the Red Summer because of the time period and brutal murders of mainly African Americans.

Two main factors ensured further separation between races and classes, and ultimately the development of contemporary ghettos: the relocation of industrial enterprises, and the movement of middle to upper class residents into suburban neighborhoods. Between 1967 and 1987, economic restructuring resulted in a dramatic decline of manufacturing jobs. The once thriving northern and western industrial cities directed a shift to service occupations and in combination with the movement of middle-class families and other businesses to the suburbs, left much economic devastation in the inner cities. Consequently, African-Americans were disproportionately affected and became either unemployed or underemployed with little wage and reduced benefits. Accordingly, a concentration of African-Americans was established in the inner city neighborhoods.

It is also significant to compare the demographic patterns between black people and European immigrants, according to the labor market. European immigrants and African-Americans were both subject to an ethnic division of labor, and consequently African-Americans have predominated in the least secure division of the labor market. David Ward refers to this stagnant position in African-American or Black ghettos as the 'elevator' model, which implies that each group of immigrants or migrants takes turns in the processes of social mobility and suburbanization; and several groups did not start on the ground floor. The inability of black people to move from the ground floor, as Ward suggests, is dependent upon prejudice and segregationist patterns experienced in the South prior to World War I. After the exodus of African-Americans to the North during and after World War I, the range of occupations in the North was further altered by the settlement of European immigrants; thus, African-Americans were diminished to unskilled jobs. The slow rate of advancement in black communities outlines the rigidity of the labor market, competition and conflict, adding another dimension to the prevalence of poverty and social instability in African-American or Black ghettos.

Effect of World War II on development 
In the years following World War II, many white Americans began to move away from inner cities to newer suburban communities, a process known as white flight. White flight occurred, in part, as a response to black people moving into white urban neighborhoods. Discriminatory practices, especially those intended to "preserve" emerging white suburbs, restricted the ability of black people to move from inner cities to the suburbs, even when they were economically able to afford it. In contrast to this, the same period in history marked a massive suburban expansion available primarily to whites of both wealthy and working-class backgrounds, facilitated through highway construction and the availability of federally subsidized home mortgages (VA, FHA, Home Owners' Loan Corporation). These made it easier for families to buy new houses in the suburbs, but not to rent apartments in cities.

The United States began restructuring its economy after World War II, fueled by new globalizing processes, and demonstrated through technological advances and improvements in efficiency. The structural shift of 1973, during the post-Fordist era, became a large component to the racial ghetto and its relationship with the labor market. Sharon Zukin declares the designated stratum of African-Americans in the labor force was placed even below the working class; low-skill urban jobs were now given to incoming immigrants from Mexico or the Caribbean. Additionally, Zukin notes, "Not only have social services been drastically reduced, punitive and other social controls over the poor have been increased," such as law enforcement and imprisonment. Described as the "urban crisis" during the 1970s and 1980s, the transition stressed regional divisions according to differences in income and racial lines—white "donuts" around black holes. Hardly coincidental, the steady separation occurred during the period of civil rights laws, urban riots and Black Power. In addition, the International Encyclopedia of Social Sciences stresses the various challenges developed by this "urban crisis", including:

The cumulative economic and social forces in ghettos give way to social, political and economic isolation and inequality, while indirectly defining a separation between superior and inferior status of groups.

In response to the influx of black people from the South, banks, insurance companies, and businesses began denying or increasing the cost of services, such as banking, insurance, access to jobs, access to health care, or even supermarkets to residents in certain, often racially determined, areas. The most devastating form of redlining, and the most common use of the term, refers to mortgage discrimination. Data on house prices and attitudes toward integration suggest that in the mid-twentieth century, segregation was a product of collective actions taken by non-black people to exclude black people from outside neighborhoods.

The "Racial" Provisions of the FHA Underwriting Manual of 1936 included the following guidelines which exacerbated the segregation issue:

This meant that ethnic minorities could secure mortgage loans only in certain areas, and it resulted in a large increase in the residential racial segregation and urban decay in the United States. The creation of new highways in some cases divided and isolated black neighborhoods from goods and services, many times within industrial corridors. For example, Birmingham, Alabama's interstate highway system attempted to maintain the racial boundaries that had been established by the city's 1926 racial zoning law. The construction of interstate highways through black neighborhoods in the city led to significant population loss in those neighborhoods and is associated with an increase in neighborhood racial segregation. Residential segregation was further perpetuated because whites were willing to pay more than black people to live in predominantly white areas. Some social scientists suggest that the historical processes of suburbanization and decentralization are instances of white privilege that have contributed to contemporary patterns of environmental racism.

Following the emergence of anti-discrimination policies in housing and labor sparked by the civil rights movement, members of the black middle class moved out of the ghetto. The Fair Housing Act was passed in 1968. This was the first federal law that outlawed discrimination in the sale and rental of housing on the basis of race, color, national origin, religion and later sex, familial status, and disability. The Office of Fair Housing and Equal Opportunity was charged with administering and enforcing the law. Since housing discrimination became illegal, new housing opportunities were made available to the black community and many left the ghetto. Urban sociologists frequently title this historical event as "black middle class exodus", or black flight. Elijah Anderson describes a process by which members of the black middle class begin to distance themselves socially and culturally from ghetto residents during the later half of the twentieth century, "eventually expressing this distance by literally moving away." This is followed by the exodus of black working-class families. As a result, the ghetto becomes primarily occupied by what sociologists and journalists of the 1980s and 1990s frequently title the "underclass." William Julius Wilson suggests this exodus worsens the isolation of the black underclass — not only are they socially and physically distanced from whites, they are also isolated from the black middle class.

Theories on the development of Black ghettos 
Two dominant theories arise pertaining to the production and development of U.S. ghettos: race-based and class-based; as well as an alternative theory put forward by Thomas Sowell.

Race-based theories 
First are the race-based theorists, who argue the importance of race in ghettos. Their analysis consists of the dominant racial group in the U.S. (White Anglo-Saxon Protestants) and their use of certain racist tactics in order to maintain their hegemony over black people and lengthen their spatial separation. Race-based theorists offset other arguments that focus on the influence of the economy on segregation. More contemporary research of race-based theorists is to frame a range of methods conducted by white Americans to "preserve race-based residential inequities" as a function of the dominantly white, state-run government. Involving uneven development, mortgage and business discrimination and disinvestment—U.S. ghettos then, as suggested by race-based theorists, are conserved by distinctly racial reasoning.

Class-based theories 
The more dominant view, on the other hand, is represented by class-based theorists. Such theories confirm class to be more important than race in the structuring of U.S. ghettos. Although racial concentration is a key signifier for ghettos, class-based theorists emphasize the role and impact of broader societal structures in the creation of African-American or Black ghettos. Dynamics of low-wage service and unemployment triggered from deindustrialization, and the intergenerational diffusion of status within families and neighborhoods, for instance, prove the rise in socioeconomic polarization between classes to be the creator of American ghetto; not racism. Furthermore, the culture of poverty theory, first developed by Oscar Lewis, states that a prolonged history of poverty can itself become a cultural obstacle to socioeconomic success, and in turn can continue a pattern of socioeconomic polarization. Ghettos, in short, instill a cultural adaptation to social and class-based inequalities, reducing the ability of future generations to mobilize or migrate.

Alternative theory 
An alternative theory put forward by Thomas Sowell in Black Rednecks and White Liberals asserts that modern urban black ghetto culture is rooted in the white Cracker culture of the North Britons and Scots-Irish who migrated from the generally lawless border regions of Britain to the American South, where they formed a redneck culture common to both black and white people in the antebellum South. Characteristics of this culture included lively music and dance, violence, unbridled emotions, flamboyant imagery, illegitimacy, religious oratory marked by strident rhetoric, and a lack of emphasis on education and intellectual interests. Because redneck culture proved counterproductive, "that culture long ago died out...among both white and black Southerners, while still surviving today in the poorest and worst of the urban black ghettos", which Sowell described as being characterized by "brawling, braggadocio, self-indulgence, [and] disregard of the future", and where "belligerence is considered being manly and crudity is considered cool, while being civilized is regarded as 'acting white'." Sowell blames liberal Americans who since the 1960s have embraced black ghetto culture as the only "'authentic' black culture and even glamorize it" while they "denounce any criticism of the ghetto lifestyle or any attempt to change it." Sowell asserts that white liberal Americans have perpetuated this "counterproductive and self-destructive lifestyle" among black Americans living in urban ghettos through "the welfare state, and look-the-other-way policing, and smiling at 'gangsta rap'."

U.S. characterizations of "ghetto" 
Contemporary African-American or Black ghettos are characterized by an overrepresentation of a particular ethnicity or race, vulnerability to crime, social problems, governmental reliance and political disempowerment. Sharon Zukin explains that through these reasons, society rationalizes the term "bad neighborhoods." Zukin stresses that these circumstances are largely related to "racial concentration, residential abandonment, and de-constitution and reconstitution of communal institutions." Many scholars diagnose this poorly facilitated and fragmented view of the United States as the "age of extremes." This term argues that inequalities of wealth and power reinforce spatial separation; for example, the growth of gated communities can be interconnected with the continued "ghettoization" of the poor.

Another characteristic to African-American or Black ghettos and spatial separation is the dependence on the state, and lack of communal autonomy; Sharon Zukin refers to Brownsville, Brooklyn, as an example. This relationship between racial ghettos and the state is demonstrated through various push and pull features, implemented through government subsidized investments, which certainly assisted the movement of white Americans into the suburbs after World War II. Since the 1960s, after the de-constitution of the inner cities, African-American or Black ghettos have attempted to reorganize or reconstitute; in effect, they are increasingly regarded as public- and state-dependent communities. Brownsville, for instance, initiated the constitution of community-established public housing, anti-poverty organizations, and social service facilities—all, in their own way, depend on state resources. However, certain dependence contradicts society's desires to be autonomous actors in the market. Moreover, Zukin implies, "the less 'autonomous' the community—in its dependence on public schools, public housing and various subsidy programs—the greater the inequity between their organizations and the state, and the less willing residents are to organize." This should not, however, undermine local development corporations or social service agencies helping these neighborhoods. The lack of autonomy and growing dependence on the state, especially in a neoliberal economy, remains a key indicator to the production as well as the prevalence of African-American or Black ghettos, particularly due to the lack of opportunities to compete in the global market.

The concept of the ghetto and underclass has faced criticism both theoretically and empirically. Research has shown significant differences in resources for neighborhoods with similar populations both across cities and over time. This includes differences in the resources of neighborhoods with predominantly low income or racial minority populations. The cause of these differences in resources across similar neighborhoods has more to do with dynamics outside of the neighborhood. To a large extent the problem with the ghetto and underclass concepts stem from the reliance on case studies (in particular case studies from Chicago), which limit social scientist understandings of socially disadvantaged neighborhoods.

Internal characterizations 
Despite mainstream America's use of the term ghetto to signify a poor, culturally or racially homogenous urban area, those living in the area often used it to signify something positive. The black ghettos did not always contain dilapidated houses and deteriorating projects, nor were all of its residents poverty-stricken. For many African-Americans, the ghetto was "home": a place representing authentic blackness and a feeling, passion, or emotion derived from rising above the struggle and suffering of being black in America.

Langston Hughes relays in his "Negro Ghetto" (1931) and "The Heart of Harlem" (1945)  poems:

Playwright August Wilson uses the term "ghetto" in Ma Rainey's Black Bottom (1984) and Fences (1985), both of which draw upon the author's experience growing up in the Hill District of Pittsburgh, a black ghetto.

Modern usage and reinterpretations of "ghetto" 
Recently the word "ghetto" has been used in slang as an adjective rather than a noun. It is used to indicate an object's relation to the inner city  and also more broadly to denote something that is shabby or of low quality. While "ghetto" as an adjective can be used derogatorily, the African-American or Black community, particularly the hip hop scene, has taken the word for themselves and begun using it in a more positive sense that transcends its derogatory origins.

In 1973, Geographical Review claimed "The degree of residential segregation of the black community is greater than for any other group in urban America, yet black people have not had the political power necessary to exercise any significant degree of control over the improvement of the basic services necessary for their health, education, and welfare." Scholars have been interested in the study of African-American or Black ghettos precisely for the concentration of disadvantaged residents and their vulnerability to social problems. American ghettos also bring attention to geographical and political barriers, and as Doreen Massey highlights, that racial segregation in African-American or Black ghettos challenge America's democratic foundations. However, it is still advocated that "One solution to these problems depends on our ability to use the political process in eliminating the inequities... geographical knowledge and theory to public-policy decisions about poor people and poor regions is a professional obligation."

European ghettos (Non-Jewish)

Roma ghettos 

There are many Roma ghettos in the European Union. The Czech government estimates that there are approximately 830 Roma ghettos in the Czech Republic.

In Northern Ireland 

In Northern Ireland, towns and cities have long been segregated along ethnic, religious and political lines. The two main communities of Northern Ireland are:

 the Irish nationalist-republican community, who mainly self-identify as Irish or Catholic; and
 the unionist-loyalist community, who mainly self-identify as British or Protestant.

Ghettos emerged in Belfast during the riots that accompanied the Irish War of Independence. For safety, people fled to areas where their community was the majority. Many more ghettos emerged after the 1969 riots and beginning of the "Troubles." In August 1969 the British Army was deployed to restore order and separate the two sides. The government built barriers called "peace lines." Many of the ghettos came under the control of paramilitaries such as the (republican) Provisional Irish Republican Army and the (loyalist) Ulster Defence Association. One of the most notable ghettos was Free Derry.

In the United Kingdom
The existence of ethnic enclaves in the United Kingdom is controversial. Southall Broadway, a predominantly Asian area in Greater London, where less than 12 percent of the population is white, has been cited as an example of a 'ghetto', but in reality the area is home to a number of different ethnic groups and religious groups.

Analysis of data from Census 2001 revealed that only two wards in England and Wales, both in Birmingham, had one dominant non-white ethnic group comprising more than two-thirds of the local population, but there were 20 wards where whites were a minority making up less than a third of the local population. By 2001, two London boroughs—Newham and Brent—had "minority majority" populations, and most parts of the city tend to have a diverse population.

Historically, some parts of London have long been noted for the prevalence of a particular ethnic or religious group (such as the Jewish communities of Golders Green and other parts of the London Borough of Barnet, and the West Indian community of Notting Hill), but in each case these populations have been part of a broader multicultural population. In the late 19th and early 20th century, the East End of London was also noted for its Jewish population, but now has a significant British Bangladeshi populace.

In Denmark 

Until 2021  the Danish government sometimes used the word ghetto to describe particularly vulnerable public housing areas in the country. The designation was applied to areas based on the residents' income levels, employment status, education levels, criminal convictions and 'non-Western' ethnic background.

In 2017, the population of Denmark was 5.7 million, of which 8.7% were non-Western immigrants or their descendants. The population proportion of 'ghetto residents' with non-Western background was 66.5%. Since 2010, the Danish Ministry of Transport, Building and Housing publishes the Ghettolisten (the 'List of Ghettos') which, in 2018, consists of 25 areas.

In his 2018 New Year Speech, Danish Prime Minister Lars Løkke Rasmussen announced his government's intention to "end the existence of parallel societies and ghettos by 2030." The government has since proposed measures to solve the issue of integration which include policies like 30 hours of obligatory daycare per week for 'ghetto children' starting age 1, lowering social welfare for ghetto residents, incentives for reducing unemployment, demolition and rebuilding of certain tenements, doubling punishment for certain crimes like theft and vandalism in the ghettos, rights for landlords to refuse housing to convicts, etc. While some proposals like restricting 'ghetto children' to their homes after 8 p.m. have been rejected for being too radical, most of the 22 proposals have been agreed upon by a parliamentary majority. The policies have been criticized for undercutting 'equality before law' and for portraying immigrants, especially Muslim immigrants, in a bad light.

In June 2019 a new social democratic government was formed in Denmark, with Kaare Dybvad becoming housing minister. He stated that the new government would stop using the word "ghetto" for vulnerable housing areas, as it is both imprecise and derogatory.

In France 
In France, a banlieue is a suburb of a large city. Banlieues are divided into autonomous administrative entities and do not constitute part of the city proper. For instance, 80% of the inhabitants of the Paris area live outside the city of Paris. Like the city centre, suburbs may be rich, middle-class or poor — Versailles, Le Vésinet, Maisons-Laffitte and Neuilly-sur-Seine are affluent banlieues of Paris, while Clichy-sous-Bois, Bondy and Corbeil-Essonnes are less so. However, since the 1970s, banlieues increasingly means, in French of France, low-income housing projects (HLMs) in which mainly foreign immigrants and French of foreign descent reside, often in perceived poverty traps.

In popular culture 
A number of songs and films have been written about/depicting the ghetto.

Film 

 The Wall (1982), a TV Movie about the Warsaw ghetto uprising
 Boyz n the Hood (1991), a film about three young males living in Los Angeles' Crenshaw ghetto
 Menace II Society (1993), about a young street hustler who attempts to escape the ghetto in a quest for a better life
 Uprising (2001), a TV Movie in which Jews rise up in the Warsaw Ghetto against the Nazis in 1943.
 The Courageous Heart of Irena Sendler (2009), a TV movie about the titular Irena Sendler who saved the lives of hundreds of Jewish children by smuggling them out of the Warsaw ghetto in Poland
 Who Will Write Our History (2018), a film about Emanuel Ringelblum, and the secret archive that he created and led in the Warsaw Ghetto

Music 
 "In the Ghetto" (originally titled "The Vicious Circle"), a 1969 song about birth and life in slum areas, written by Mac Davis and made famous by Elvis Presley
 "The Ghetto" (1970), soul song by Donny Hathaway
 "Ghetto Life " (1981), funk song by Rick James
 "The Ghetto" (1990), hip-hop song written by Too Short
 "Ghetto" (2001), a song by P.O.D. from Satellite
 "Ghetto" (2004) by Akon
 "Ghetto" (2007), R&B song written by American singer Kelly Rowland
 "Ghetto" (2011), a song by Junai Kaden featuring Mumzy Stranger from From Me to You.
 "Ghetto" (2014), an R&B song by August Alsina

See also 

 Balkanization
 Bantustan
 Blockbusting
 Favela
 Gated community
 Ghetto fabulous
 Ghetto tax
 Indian reservation
 Islam in Europe
 Jewish quarter
 Poverty map
 Rural ghetto
 Shanty town
 Skid row
 Slum
 Township (South Africa)
 Trailer park
 Urbanization
 Urban vitality

References

External links 

 
 Ghetto
Racial segregation
Urban decay
Italian inventions